The  1954-55 French Rugby Union Championship of first division was contested by 48 clubs divided into six pools of eight. The five better of each pool and the two better sixths (for a sum of 32 clubs) were qualified to play a "single match play-off" tournament.

Previously the FFR created three divisions: Nationale (or first division), Fédérale (second division) and Excellence (third division).

The Championship of first division was won by the Perpignan that defeated Lourdes in the final. It was the sixth won by Perpignan.

Context 
The 1955 Five Nations Championship was won by Wales and France with some points.

The Challenge Yves du Manoir was won by Perpignan that defeated Mazamet in the final.

Qualification phase 

In bold the qualified for "last 32" round

"Last 32" 
In bold the clubs qualified for The "last 16".

"Last 16" 

In bold the clubs qualified for the quarter of finals.

Quarter of finals 

In bold the clubs qualified for the semifinals.

Semifinals

Final 

The match was played at the Parc Lescure that host the final of French Championship for the first time.

Notes and references

External links
 Compte rendu finale de 1955 lnr.fr

1955
France 1955
Championship